Namakwa is one of the 5 districts of the Northern Cape province of South Africa. The seat of Namakwa is Springbok and the region is also known as Little Namaqualand. The majority of its 108,118 people speak Afrikaans (2001 Census). The district code is DC6.

Geography

Neighbours

Namakwa is surrounded by:
 the republic of Namibia in the north
 ZF Mgcawu (DC8) in the north-east
 Pixley ka Seme (DC7) in the east
 Central Karoo (DC5) in the south-east
 Cape Winelands (DC2) – in the south (formerly the Boland District Municipality)
 West Coast (DC1) in the south-west
 the Atlantic Ocean in the west

Local municipalities
The district contains the following local municipalities:

Demographics
The following statistics are from the 2001 census.

Gender

Ethnic group

Age

Politics

Election results
Election results for Namakwa in the South African general election, 2004. 
 Population 18 and over: 70 397 [65.11% of total population]
 Total votes: 44 220 [40.90% of total population]
 Voting % estimate: 62.82% votes as a % of population 18 and over

References

External links 
 Official Website for Namakwa District Municipality

District municipalities of the Northern Cape
Namakwa District Municipality
Namaqualand